Jharkal is a village and one of the 45 Union Councils (administrative subdivisions) of Khushab District in the Punjab Province of Pakistan. It is located at 31°48'0N 71°49'60E.

References

Union councils of Khushab District
Populated places in Khushab District